Alex Parsons (born September 14, 1987) was an American football center in the National Football League (NFL). He played college football at University of Southern California (USC).

High school career
Parsons attended Woodbridge High School in Irvine, California. As a junior in 2004, he made All-Seaview League while posting 102 tackles, 7 sacks, 4 forced fumbles and 2 interceptions. He played 3 years on the varsity. He made 2005 Super Prep All-American, Prep Star All-American, Super Prep All-Farwest, Prep Star All-Western, Long Beach Press-Telegram Best in the West honorable mention, Orange County Register Fab 15 second-team, Tacoma News-Tribune Western 100, Cal-Hi Sports All-State second-team, CaliFlorida Bowl Defensive MVP, All-CIF Southern Section first-team, All-CIF Division VI first-team, Orange County Register All-Orange County first-team and All-Seaview League first-team as a senior defensive lineman, linebacker, tight end and offensive lineman at Woodbridge High School in Irvine, California. He had 104 tackles, 18 tackles for loss and 4 sacks in 2005.

College career
Parsons played at the University of Southern California (USC).

2008: Parsons started USC's last 10 games at right offensive guard as a junior in 2008 after serving as a key backup there in the first 3 contests. He also appeared on special teams.

2007: As a sophomore in 2007, Parsons was switched from defensive tackle to offensive tackle in 2007 fall camp. He saw action in all 13 games on special teams (primarily on kickoff return) and limited action as a backup on the offensive line (against Idaho, Notre Dame, UCLA and Illinois). He made a tackle against Idaho (following an interception). He had arthroscopic surgery on torn cartilage in his right knee prior to 2007 spring practice.

2006: Parsons was a reserve freshman defensive tackle in 2006, his first year at USC. He appeared in all 13 games in 2006, primarily on special teams. He saw limited action at defensive tackle in 2 games (Arkansas, Oregon), but he did not make a tackle. He won USC's Service Team Defensive Player of the Year Award.

Professional career

Oakland Raiders
Parsons signed as a free agent with the Oakland Raiders after going undrafted in the 2010 NFL Draft. On January 3, 2012 signed a future/reserve contract with Oakland Raiders. On August 26, 2013, he was waived/injured by the Raiders. On August 27, 2013, he cleared waivers and was reverted to the Raiders' injured reserve list. On August 28, 2013, he was waived with an injury settlement.

Cleveland Browns
Parsons signed with the Cleveland Browns on June 9, 2014.

Personal life
He's a sociology major at USC. His brother, B. Jay Parsons, was a defensive end at Kentucky (2004–05).

References

External links
 
 Oakland Raiders bio
 Cleveland Browns bio

USC Trojans football players
American football offensive linemen
Sportspeople from Irvine, California
Living people
1987 births
Oakland Raiders players
Cleveland Browns players